Victor Blue (December 6, 1865 – January 22, 1928) was a rear admiral of the United States Navy.

Career
Lieutenant Blue was advanced five numbers for intelligence missions in Cuba during the Spanish–American War. He served on the Suwanee, and attracted general attention in June, 1898, by penetrating 72 miles (116 km) within the Spanish lines in the vicinity of Santiago, Cuba, and definitely determining for the first time the presence of the  Spanish fleet in Santiago harbor. He commanded the Alvarado, a gunboat captured from the Spanish, in the attack upon Manzanillo, became Flag lieutenant in the Pacific Squadron, and served in the Philippines in 1900–01.

From the ranks of inspector of ordnance, held in 1905–07, he was promoted until he became commander in 1909 and in 1910 chief of staff in the Pacific Fleet. Soon thereafter he was transferred to duty on the General Board of the Navy Department. He served as Chief of the Bureau of Navigation (1913–16 and 1919). Under Admiral Beatty he commanded Texas (BB-35) in the North Sea during her service with the 6th Battle Squadron. He was made rear-admiral on April 1, 1919. Rear Admiral Blue was retired in June, 1919, because of disability received in line of duty. He died 22 January 1928.

Namesake
In 1937, the destroyer  was named in his honor.

United States awards

Navy Distinguished Service Medal
Specially Meritorious Service Medal
Sampson Medal
Spanish Campaign Medal

World War I Victory Medal

Attribution

External links

1865 births
1928 deaths
United States Naval Academy alumni
United States Navy rear admirals (lower half)
United States Navy personnel of World War I
United States Navy personnel of the Spanish–American War
Recipients of the Navy Distinguished Service Medal